Garcinia mannii is a dioecious and evergreen flowering tree in the family Clusiaceae or Guttiferae. The specific epithet (mannii) honors German botanist Gustav Mann. It is not to be confused with Garcinia mannii var. brevipedicellata, a synonym for Garcinia brevipedicellata.

Distribution
Garcinia mannii is native to southern Guinea and Liberia east to Nigeria and south to Gabon and western Democratic Republic of the Congo.

Description

Its leaves are elliptical in shape and slightly rounded, and the flowers have four red petals with yellow-orange centers. They occur on long stems in clusters of 1-2. Mature trees are often densely branched, with the foliage often concealing the trunk. The branches often appear relatively close to the ground. The bark is brown in color and relatively smooth.

Uses
Due to the chemical composition of the plant, it is used as a chewing stick across its native range.

See also
Garcinia
List of Garcinia species

References

mannii
Flora of Africa
Taxa named by Daniel Oliver
Flora of West Tropical Africa
Flora of West-Central Tropical Africa
Trees of Africa
Trees of the Democratic Republic of the Congo
Plants described in 1868